ThinkPark Tower (シンクパークタワー) is a 30-story skyscraper, part of the ThinkPark redevelopment area in Ōsaki, Tokyo. The building construction started in 2004, based on designs by Nikken Sekkei with additional input from CIA, Inc. / The Brand Architect Group and Neil Denari. It was completed in 2007. The official opening took place on October 25 of the same year.

The ThinkPark complex, which encompasses the building, distinguishes itself by being the first green urbanism project in Japan. Richard Seireeni of The Brand Architect Group named the complex, designed the logo and devised the green urbanism marketing strategy. This approach in turn helped the developers in renting the entire lease space over one year prior to opening. The main functions of the building are office and retail space for companies, restaurants, retail establishments and clinics.

Tenants

Office tenants

Sumitomo Heavy Industries headquarters
Meidensha headquarters
MOS Burger headquarters
SEN Corporation headquarters
Shin Nippon Machinery headquarters
Dassault Systemes K.K. headquarters
PUMA Japan K.K.
Alcatel-Lucent Japan
Nippon Boehringer Ingelheim Co. headquarters
Radio Frequency Systems sales office
The Marine Foods Corporation headquarters
Nippon Valqua Industries headquarters
Sumitomo Mitsui Banking Corporation Osaki branch
So-net Corporation headquarters

Clinics 
 ThinkPark Tower International Medical Clinic
 Thinkpark Heart Clinic

Restaurants  and shops
The building accommodates Japanese-, Chinese-, and western-style restaurants as well as fast-food establishments like MOS Burger and Denny's. There are shops, pharmacies and other service-oriented businesses on the lower floors.

References

External links 
 

Shinagawa
Skyscraper office buildings in Tokyo
Modernist architecture in Japan
Office buildings completed in 2007
Retail buildings in Tokyo
2007 establishments in Japan